Dejan Čukić (born 25 November 1966) is a Serbian-Danish actor. He appeared in the Wallander TV film series as Lars in The Ghost, based on the novel by Henning Mankell.  He also played Cardinal Giulano della Rovere in the TV drama series Borgia.

Selected filmography

External links

1966 births
Living people
People from Berane
Serbs of Montenegro
Montenegrin male actors
Serbian male film actors
Danish male film actors
Yugoslav emigrants to Denmark
Danish people of Serbian descent
21st-century Montenegrin male actors
21st-century Serbian male actors
Danish male television actors
21st-century Danish male actors
Best Actor Bodil Award winners